Lecithocera gilviana is a moth in the family Lecithoceridae. It was described by Kyu-Tek Park and Chun-Sheng Wu in 2010. It is found in southern Thailand.

References

Moths described in 2010
gilviana